Munditiella is a genus of sea snails, marine gastropod mollusks in the family Skeneidae.

Species
Species within the genus Munditiella include:
 Munditiella ammonoceras (A. Adams, 1863)
 Munditiella kirai (Habe, 1961)
 Munditiella qualum (Hedley, 1899)

References

 Higo, S., Callomon, P. & Goto, Y. (1999) Catalogue and Bibliography of the Marine Shell-Bearing Mollusca of Japan. Elle Scientific Publications, Yao, Japan, 749 pp

External links
 To GenBank 
 To World Register of Marine Species

 
Skeneidae
Gastropod genera